Petrojet Sporting Club is an Egyptian sports club based in Suez, Egypt. The club is related to Petrojet, a construction company specialized in oil, gas and petrochemical industries.

Petrojet is mainly known for its football team, which currently plays in the Egyptian Second Division, the second-highest league in the Egyptian football league system.

Petrojet was promoted to the Egyptian Premier League for the first time in their history only six years after their foundation, as they were promoted from the Egyptian Second Division during the 2005–06 season.

History

Petrojet's history in The Egyptian Premier League

Stadium
Petrojet formerly played their home games at Cairo International Stadium. They now play in Suez Stadium .

Technical staff

Squad

Current first team squad
Egyptian Football Association (EFA) rules are that a team may only have 3 foreign born players in the squad.

Performance in Egyptian competitions
Egyptian Premier League: 5 appearances
2006–07 – Seventh Place
2007–08 – Fifth Place
2008–09 – Third Place
2009–10 – Fourth Place
2010–11 – Tenth Place
Egyptian Cup: 7 appearances
2002–03 – Round of 32
2004–05 – Round of 16
2006–07 – Round of 16
2007–08 – Quarter-finals
2008–09 – Semi-finals
2009–10 – Quarter-finals
2010–11 – Quarter-finals

Performance in CAF competitions
PR = Preliminary round
FR = First round
SR = Second round

Best achievements

Domestic
 Egyptian Premier League
2008–09 – Third
 Egyptian Cup
2008–09 – Semi-Finals
2014–15 – Semi-Finals

Individual honours
Top Goal Scorer in the Egyptian Premier league
The following players have won Top Goal Scorer award in the Egyptian league while playing for PetroJet :
 2007–08 :  Alaa Ibrahim – 15 Goals
The following players have won Second Top Goal Scorer award in the Egyptian league while playing for PetroJet :
 2009–10 :  Eric Bekoe – 13 Goals

Managers
 Fathi Mabrouk (2004–05)
 Mokhtar Mokhtar (July 1, 2005 – May 31, 2010)
 Helmy Toulan (June 8, 2010 – May 26, 2011)
 Mohamed Omar (May 26, 2011 – July 12, 2011)
 Taha Basry (July 19, 2011 – May 16, 2012)
 Ramadan El Sayed (May 21, 2012 – May 2, 2013)
 Mokhtar Mokhtar (May 2, 2013–?)
 Ahmed Hassan (2015–2015)
 Hassan Shehata (2015–present)

Notable players

References

External links
 Official Website
 Official Page of Facebook
 Official Group of Facebook
 PetroJet Club Channel

 
Football clubs in Egypt
Association football clubs established in 2000
2000 establishments in Egypt
Sports clubs in Egypt